The ATP Lyon Open (also known as the Open Parc Auvergne-Rhône-Alpes Lyon) is a men's tennis event on the ATP Tour held in the French city of Lyon. Since 2017, it has been part of the ATP 250 Series and is played on outdoor clay courts. It replaced the Open de Nice Côte d'Azur on the ATP calendar. Former professional tennis player Thierry Ascione is the tournament director. 

The tournament is one of four French events of the ATP Tour 250 series, along with the Open Sud de France, the Open 13 and the Moselle Open.

Ivan Dodig is the doubles record holder with two victories.

Results

Singles

Doubles

See also
 Grand Prix de Tennis de Lyon
 WTA Lyon Open

References

External links

 
Clay court tennis tournaments
Tennis tournaments in France
ATP Tour 250
Sports competitions in Lyon
2017 establishments in France
Recurring sporting events established in 2017